The Taipan 28 is a cruising sailing yacht.  The  GRP bermuda rigged sloop was designed and built in Pak Sha Wan, Hong Kong by Interchem Engineers Ltd.

Around 100 were built from approximately 1970-1980 starting with hull number 100.  They have a full keel and a relatively short rig. Different interiors were built, with interior tables or berths to starboard and 3-4 berths. They were powered by an inboard diesel engine.

Specifications

General

Length Overall (L.O.A):   28'0"      8.53m
Waterline Length (L.W.L): 20'9"      6.3m
Beam:                     7'9"       2.36m
Draft:                    4'6"       1.37m
Ballast Keel:             3,064 lb    1,389 kg

Displacement

Displacement:             7,850 lb    3,560 kg

Sail Area

Working sail area:        
With Genoa jib:

Tank capacity

Fuel                      9 gallon   34 litre
Water                     23 gallon  87.06 litre

Engine

Almost all boats were fitted with MD1B Volvo Penta engines. Marine Diesel, 10 HP, 1 cylinder, 4 stroke, water cooled, max speed 2500 rpm, ratio 1.87:1 with 12 volt dyna starter.

Known Vessels

Racing
The Aberdeen Boat Club, Hong Kong holds an annual Classic Yacht Rally which includes a division for locally built Taipans called the Taipan Cup.

Taipan Cup

References

External links
 Royal Hong Kong Yacht Club website
 Aberdeen Boat Club website
 Official Volvo Penta Site

Sailing yachts
1960s sailboat type designs